Thalassocella is a genus of bacteria from the family of Phyllobacteriaceae, with one known species (Thalassocella subtropicalis).

References

Gammaproteobacteria
Bacteria genera
Monotypic bacteria genera